The Serra Santa Cruz is a Brazilian mountain range in the state of Alagoas. It has the highest point in that state, reaching .

References 

Santa Cruz
Highest points of Brazilian states
Landforms of Alagoas